Saleem Raza Jalbani is a Pakistani politician who had been a Member of the Provincial Assembly of Sindh, from May 2013 to May 2018.

Early life and education

He was born on 21 June 1964 in Karachi.

He has a degree of Bachelor of Arts from Sindh University.

Political career

He was elected to the Provincial Assembly of Sindh as a candidate of Pakistan Peoples Party from Constituency PS-25 SHAHEED BANAZIR ABAD-II in 2013 Pakistani general election.

References

Living people
Sindh MPAs 2013–2018
1964 births
Pakistan People's Party politicians
Politicians from Karachi